Breukelen is a town in the Netherlands.

Breukelen may also refer to:

People
 Gijs van Breukelen, Dutch chess composer
 Hans van Breukelen (born 1956), Dutch footballer

Places
 Breukelen-Nijenrode, now part of Breukelen, Netherlands
 Breukelen-Sint Pieters, now part of Breukelen, Netherlands
 Brooklyn, New York, U.S., named for Breukelen, Netherlands

Other uses
 FC Breukelen, Dutch football club

See also
 
 Brooklyn (disambiguation)

Dutch-language surnames